The Rubber Wall is a 1991 Italian drama film directed by Marco Risi. The film, which deals with the crash of Itavia Flight 870, entered the competition at the 48th Venice International Film Festival.

Plot   
Italy, on the evening of June 27, 1980, a civil aircraft of the Itavia, flying from Bologna to Palermo, disappears in flight. Its remains are near Ustica: eighty victims. The causes are mysterious.

Cast 
Corso Salani: Rocco Ferrante
Angela Finocchiaro: Giannina
Ivano Marescotti: Giulio 
Antonello Fassari: Franco
Carla Benedetti: Sandra
Pietro Ghislandi: Corrà
David Zard: Agente Segreto
Mario Patané: Paolo
Eliana Miglio: Anna
Gianfranco Barra: Minister of Defence
Ivo Garrani: Admiral Chief of the Defence Staff
Sergio Fiorentini: General Chief of Staff of the Air Force
Luigi Montini: General Air Force Spokesman
Tony Sperandeo: Air Force NCO
David Brandon : American Diplomat

See also    
 List of Italian films of 1991

References

External links

1991 films
Italian drama films
1991 drama films
Films directed by Marco Risi
Italian films based on actual events
1990s Italian-language films
1990s Italian films